Son of Puke is the eighth studio album by Zoogz Rift, released in September 1987 by SST Records. Side one contains tape manipulations of music that had been previously recorded by Rift's band. The second side contains a discarded musical recording by The Transients. Rift discovered the recording and liked it so much that he decided it deserved to be officially released. It is the only known recording by the group.

Track listing

Personnel 
Adapted from the Son of Puke liner notes.
Zoogz Rift – vocals, guitar, ARP 2600 synthesizer, Casio VL-1 synthesizer, tape, production

Release history

References

External links 
 Son of Puke at Discogs (list of releases)

1987 albums
SST Records albums
Zoogz Rift albums